Tourtellotte & Hummel was an American architectural firm from Boise, Idaho and Portland, Oregon.

The firm was established in Boise in 1896 as the private practice of architect John E. Tourtellotte.  In 1901, he made Charles F. Hummel a partner in John E. Tourtellotte & Company, and this was announced in February 1902.  However it was not until 1910 when Hummel was put on equal footing with Tourtellotte, when the firm became Tourtellotte & Hummel.  They both moved to Portland in 1913, although the Boise office was maintained.  In 1922 Tourtellotte and Hummel split, and one of Hummel's sons, Frank K. Hummel became partner.

Tourtellotte left the partnership in 1930, remaining in Portland.  Hummel continued the office as Tourtellotte & Hummel in Portland until about 1934, and in Boise until 1942. The firm closed in 1942 for the duration of World War II, and resumed in 1946 as Hummel, Hummel & Jones. Throughout its legacy, the firm changed its name with new leadership. In 1996, the firm stopped the practice of renaming with leadership changes and since then has been named Hummel Architects, PLLC.

List of Firm Names 

 1896 - John E. Tourtellotte & Co.
 1910 - Tourtellotte & Hummel
 1945 - Hummel, Hummel & Jones
 1967 - Hummel, Hummel, Jones & Shawver
 1977 - Hummel, Jones, Shawver & Miller, P.A.
 1980 - Hummel, Jones, Miller, Hunsucker, P.A.
 1984 - Hummel/Dropping Architects, P.A.
 1995 - Hummel & Hunsucker Architects, P.A.
 1996 - Hummel Architects, PLLC

Works
(this list is not comprehensive)

Tourtellotte & Hummel, 1906-1942
 Cathedral of St. John the Evangelist, 707 N 8th Street, Boise Idaho (1906-1921)
 John Daly House, 1015 W. Hays St., Boise, Idaho (1910)
 Eichelberger Apartments, 612-624 N. 9th St., Boise, Idaho (1910)
 J. H. Gakey House, 1402 W. Franklin St., Boise, Idaho (1910)
 Immanuel M. E. Church, 1406 W. Eastman St., Boise, Idaho (1910)
 M. J. Marks House, 1001 W. Hays St., Boise, Idaho (1910)
 Nampa Department Store, 1307 1st St. S., Nampa, Idaho (1910)
 Fred Reiger Houses, 214 and 216-218 E. Jefferson St., Boise, Idaho (1910)
Nampa Department Store (one-story building), in 1300 block of First St. S., Nampa, Idaho (1910) in the NRHP-listed Nampa Historic District
 Bruneau Episcopal Church, Benham Rd. & Ruth St., Bruneau, Idaho (1911)
 Chinese Odd Fellows Building, 610-612 Front St., Boise, Idaho (1911)
 John Parker House, 713 W. Franklin St., Boise, Idaho (1911)
 St. Agnes R. C. Church, 204 E. Liberty St., Weiser, Idaho (1911)
 Zurcher Apartments, 102 S. 17th St., Boise, Idaho (1911)
 Collister School, 4426 Catalpa Dr., Boise, Idaho (1912)
 William Sidenfaden House, 906 W. Franklin St., Boise, Idaho (1912)
 Edward Welch House, 1321 E. Jefferson St., Boise, Idaho (1912)
 Boise City National Bank Building (Remodeling), 805 W. Idaho St., Boise, Idaho (1913)
 E. F. Hunt House, 49 E. State St., Meridian, Idaho (1913)
 J. W. Jones Building, 104 Main St. NE, Blackfoot, Idaho (1913)
 South Boise Fire Station, 1011 Williams St., Boise, Idaho (1913)
 Elks Temple, 310 Jefferson St., Boise, Idaho (1914)
 Gorby Opera Theater, 128 E. Idaho Ave., Glenns Ferry, Idaho (1914)
 O'Neill Bros. Building, 36 E. Idaho Ave., Glenns Ferry, Idaho (1914)
 St. Charles Borromeo R. C. Church, 311 S. 1st Ave., Hailey, Idaho (1914)
 Our Lady of Limerick R. C. Church, 113 W. Arthur Ave., Glenns Ferry, Idaho (1915)
 Adolph Schreiber House, 524 W. Franklin St., Boise, Idaho (1915)
 Louis Stephan House, 1709 N. 18th St., Boise, Idaho (1915)
 F. P. Ake Building, 106-172 Main St., Mountain Home, Idaho (1916)
 Echo City Hall, 20 S. Bonanza St., Echo, Oregon (1916)
 Wasco School, 903 Barnett Street., Wasco, Oregon (1916) 
 Sacred Heart R. C. Church, 608 7th St., Parma, Idaho (1916) - Demolished.
 Administration Building, Idaho State Sanitarium, Nampa, Idaho (1917)
 H. H. Bryant Garage, 11th & Front Sts., Boise, Idaho (1917) - Demolished c.1990.
 Buildings, Gooding College, Gooding, Idaho (1917, 1920)
 Pilot Butte Inn, 1121 Wall St., Bend, Oregon (1917) - Demolished 1973.
 A. C. Butterfield House, Jenkins Creek Rd., Weiser, Idaho (1918) 
 Nampa Presbyterian Church, 2nd St. & 15th Ave. S., Nampa, Idaho (1918)
 H. R. Neitzel House, 705 N. 9th St., Boise, Idaho (1918)
 E. H. Dewey Stores, 1013-1015 1st St. S., Nampa, Idaho (1919)
 Farmers and Merchants Bank Building, 101 11th Ave. S., Nampa, Idaho (1919)
 Nampa and Meridian Irrigation District Office, 1503 1st St. S., Nampa, Idaho (1919)
Nampa Department Store (two-story building), 1307 First St. S., Nampa, Idaho (1919), in NRHP-listed Nampa Historic District
 Pedro Echevarria House, 5605 W. State St., Boise, Idaho (1920)
 New Plymouth Congregational Church, 207 Southwest Ave., New Plymouth, Idaho (1920)
 Odd Fellows Home, N. 14th Ave., Caldwell, Idaho (1920)
 Nurses' Home, St. Alphonsus' Hospital, 341 W. Washington St., Boise, Idaho (1920–21)
 Women's Dormitory, Idaho State Industrial School, St. Anthony, Idaho (1920)
 Hotel North Bend, 768 Virginia St., North Bend, Oregon (1921–22)
 Father Lobell House, 125 N. 4th St. E., Mountain Home, Idaho (1921) - Demolished c.2010.
 Roswell Grade School, Idaho 18 & Stephan Ln., Roswell, Idaho (1921)
 First M. E. Church, 404 12th Ave., Nampa, Idaho (1922–23, 1938)
 Hotel Astoria, 342 14th St., Astoria, Oregon (1922–23)
 J. S. McGinnis Building, 79 N. Commercial St., Glenns Ferry, Idaho (1922)
 Coos Bay City Hall (Old), 375 Central Ave., Coos Bay, Oregon (1923)
 Coos Bay National Bank Building, 201 Central Ave., Coos Bay, Oregon (1923)
 William Dunbar House, 1500 W. Hays St., Boise, Idaho (1923)
 St. Paul's Rectory and Sisters' House, 810 15th Ave. S., Nampa, Idaho (1923)
 H. C. Burnett House, 124 W. Bannock St., Boise, Idaho (1924)
 Lithia Springs Hotel, 212 E. Main St., Ashland, Oregon (1925)
 St. Joseph's R. C. School, 825 W. Fort St., Boise, Idaho (1925)
 St. Mary's R. C. Church, 616 Dearborn St., Caldwell, Idaho (1925)
 Franklin School, 5007 Franklin Rd, Boise, Idaho (1926) - Demolished.
 Samuel Hays House (Remodeling), 612 W. Franklin St., Boise, Idaho (1926)
 Redwoods Hotel, 310 NW 6th St., Grants Pass, Oregon (1926)
 Egyptian Theater, 700 W. Main St., Boise, Idaho (1927, attributed)
 John E. Tourtellotte Building, 210-222 N. 10th St., Boise, Idaho (1927)
 J. C. Palumbo Fruit Co. Warehouse, 633 2nd Ave. S., Payette, Idaho (1928)
 Sacred Heart R. C. Church, 211 E. 1st St, Emmett, Idaho (1928)
 St. Joseph's R. C. Church, 1st Ave. & Cedar St., Bovill, Idaho (1928)
 Baker City Tower, 1701 Main Street, Baker City, Oregon (1929)
 Bald Mountain Hot Springs Motel, 180 N. Main St., Ketchum, Idaho (1929) - Demolished.
 Billings Memorial Gymnasium, Intermountain Institute, Weiser, Idaho (1929)
 Garfield School, 1914 Broadway Ave., Boise, Idaho (1929)
 Wellman Apartments, 500 W. Franklin St., Boise, Idaho (1929)
 American Legion Chateau, 1508 2nd St. S., Nampa, Idaho (1931)
 Orville Jackson House, 127 S. Eagle Rd., Eagle, Idaho (1932)
 Pine Creek Baptist Church, 210 Main St., Pinehurst, Idaho (1932)
 U. S. Post Office, 106 W. Main St., Weiser, Idaho (1932)
 Boise Gallery of Art, 670 Julia Davis Dr., Boise, Idaho (1934–37)
 Fairbanks Main School, 800 Cushman St., Fairbanks, Alaska (1934)
 Morris Hill Cemetery Mausoleum, Morris Hill Cemetery, Boise, Idaho (1936–37)
 Boise Jr. High School, 1105 N. 13th St., Boise, Idaho (1936) - With Wayland & Fennell.
 Owyhee County Courthouse, 20381 State Hwy. 78, Murphy, Idaho (1936)
 Cole School Gymnasium, 7145 Fairview Ave., Boise, Idaho (1937) - Demolished.
 Guernsey Dairy Milk Depot, 2419 W. State St., Boise, Idaho (1937)
 St. Mary's R. C. Church, 2604 W. State St., Boise, Idaho (1937)
 Whitney School (Addition), 1609 S. Owyhee St., Boise, Idaho (1936) - Demolished.
 John Regan American Legion Hall, 401 W. Idaho St., Boise, Idaho (1939)
 Thompson Mortuary Chapel, 737 Main St., Gooding, Idaho (1939)
 Washington County Courthouse, 256 E. Court St., Weiser, Idaho (1939)
 Administration Building, Boise Jr. College, Boise, Idaho (1940) - With Wayland & Fennell.
 West Point Grade School, E. 3300 S., Wendell, Idaho (1941)

Hummel, Hummel & Jones, 1946-?
 St. Joseph's Gymnasium, 825 W. Fort St., Boise, Idaho (1948)
 St. Joseph's R. C. School (Addition), 825 W. Fort St., Boise, Idaho (1959)

Other
Architect Benjamin Morgan Nisbet worked for J.E. Tourtellotte & Company from 1903 to 1909, before going independent.

References

External links
 Current company webpage

Architecture firms based in Idaho
Defunct architecture firms based in Oregon

1896 establishments in Idaho